Kingsley Daniel Jones (5 August 1935 – 26 January 2003) was a  international rugby union player.

Jones played club rugby for Llandovery College and Cardiff RFC. He made his debut for Wales on 3 December 1960 versus South Africa and was selected for the 1962 British Lions tour to South Africa. His contemporaries on the Cardiff team included fellow prop Howard Norris.

References 

1935 births
2003 deaths
Barbarian F.C. players
British & Irish Lions rugby union players from Wales
Cardiff RFC players
Rugby union players from Pontypridd
Wales international rugby union players
Welsh rugby union players
Rugby union props